Hong Bok-won (1206–1258) was a Goryeo commander who later served as an administrator of the Mongol Empire.

He was born to Hong Daesun (洪大純), an officer in northwestern Korea. When the Mongols intruded into Goryeo to attack Khitan rebel groups in 1218, Daesun went over to the Mongols. During the first Mongol invasion in 1231, Hong Bok-won greeted the Mongol army and turned against Goryeo. His guidance for the Mongols inflamed Korean animosity against him. He remained in Seogyeong (now P'yŏngyang) as a Mongol delegate. He was banished and his father was captured by Goryeo in 1234. Ögedei Khan allowed him to settle around Liaoyang and Shenyang and installed him as an administrator. That was the beginning of Korea colonies in Liaodong, whose head was later called King of Shen (瀋王). Even though Goryeo released his father, he joined Mongol incursions into Goryeo.

Goryeo sent Wang Jun, a member of the Goryeo royal family, as a hostage to the Mongol Empire. Jun and Bok-won came to conflict with each other. In 1258 he was executed because of defamation by Wang Jun during the reign of Möngke Khan. That brought serious antagonism between Goryeo and his second son Hong Dagu.

Family
Father: Hong Daesun (홍대순)
Grandfather: Hong Je-seon (홍제선)
Grandmother: Lady Mun (부인 문씨); daughter of Mun Sin-u (문신우, 文申祐)
Unnamed mother
Younger brother: Hong Baeksu (홍백수)
Nephew: Hong-Seon (홍선)
Grandnephew: Hong-Tak (홍탁); became the father of Lady Hong, Consort Hwa
Grandnephew: Hong-Su (홍수); became the great-grandfather of Hong Gilmin (홍길민–Kingdom of Joseon's founder)
Unnamed wife
1st son: Hong Dagu (홍다구, 洪茶丘)
2nd son: Hong Gunsang (홍군상, 洪君祥)
Daughter: Lady Hong (부인 홍씨, 夫人 洪氏)
Son-in-law: Jang-Wi (장위, 張暐)

In popular culture
Portrayed by Lee Won-jae in the 2012 MBC TV series God of War.

See also
 History of Korea
 List of Goryeo people

References

13th-century Korean people
Korean people of Chinese descent
1206 births
1258 deaths